Shambhav sometimes written as Shambav or Sambhav, is an Indian name of Sanskrit origin general of the male gender.
The name originates from the word Shambhu meaning Source of Bliss/ Happiness ('sham' meaning happiness ; 'bhu' source) and it is a synonym for the Hindu God, Lord Shiva.
The name also means benevolent or kind and belonging to Lord Shiva

References

Indian given names